The Toyota RZ engine family is a straight-four piston engine series built in Japan. The RZ series uses a cast-iron engine block and aluminum SOHC or DOHC cylinder heads. It has electronic fuel injection (EFI), 2 or 4 valves per cylinder and features forged steel connecting rods.

1RZ
The 1RZ is a  version built from 1989.

Applications:
 1989–1993 Toyota HiAce CHANSI NAMBER 0003317

1RZ-E
The 1RZ-E is the fuel-injected version of the 1RZ. With redline at 5,500 rpm.

Applications:
 1989–2004 Toyota HiAce Van, Wagon
 1998–2001 Toyota Hilux
 2000–2004 Toyota Kijang/Revo/Venture

2RZ
The 2RZ is a  version.

2RZ-E

This is an SOHC engine with two valves per cylinder. Valve adjustment is by shim over bucket. Originally manufactured with a carburetor induction system, it was later upgraded to Electronic Fuel Injection, with the -E suffix added to the engine designation. Toyota specified unleaded fuel with a rating of at least 91 RON in Australia.

Applications:
 1989–2004 Toyota HiAce (encompassing the RZH1xx series)

2RZ-FE
The 2RZ-FE, and 4RB1 or 4RB2 in China, is a  version. Compression ratio is 9.5:1. This engine does not feature balance shafts. It has four valves per cylinder and DOHC. Valve adjustment is by shim over bucket. The 2RZ-FE is an interference engine. A  version called the 4RB3 is also manufactured in China.

Applications:
 1995–2004 Toyota Tacoma 4x2
 1998–2004 Toyota Hilux
 1999-2006 ARO 24 Series

3RZ

3RZ-FE
The 3RZ-FE is a  version. Compression ratio is 9.5:1. This engine features twin, chain-driven balance shafts. It has four valves per cylinder and DOHC. Valve adjustment is by shim over bucket. The 3RZ-FE is an interference engine with a timing chain.

Applications:
 1995–2004 Toyota Tacoma 
 1996–2000 Toyota 4Runner
 1994–1998 Toyota T100
 1995–2002 Granvia
 1995–2004 Toyota Hilux
 1990–2004 Toyota HiAce
 2001–2009 Toyota Land Cruiser Prado (Venezuela)
 1996–2004 Toyota Land Cruiser Prado
 1998–2002 Toyota Touring Hiace

See also

 List of Toyota engines

References

RZ